Flintshire Freeze  were a Welsh ice hockey team that play in the English National Ice Hockey League, north division. They played their games at Deeside Leisure Centre, Flintshire. They won the North League championship in the 2003/2004 season. After the re-design of the ENIHL after the 2007/08 season, the Freeze played in the North 2 conference. In 2012 the team were dissolved and replaced by a reformed Deeside Dragons.

Final roster

Goaltenders
  Dave Clancy
  Phil Crosby
  Matt Compton

Defenceman

  Steve Elliott
  Steve Fellows
  Shane Kinsey
  Alex Bryn Roberts
  Dave Costelloe

Forwards
  Rob Griffin
 Andrew Chappell
  Gary Dixon
  Lee Wheeler (MIA)
  Marc Lovell
  Chris Jones
  James Parsons
  Martin Barta

{|class="wikitable" style="font-size: 95%; "
! Season
!Position
! Wins
! Draws
! Losses
!±
|-
|2009-10
|2
|19
|1
|4
|118
|-
|2010-11
|3
|14
|1
|9
|21
|-
|2011-12
|3
|16
|1
|11
|1
|-
|}

References 

Sport in Flintshire
Ice hockey teams in Wales